Lanzen-Turnau Airport is a private use airport located  west of Turnau, Styria, Austria.

See also
List of airports in Austria

References

External links 
 Airport record for Lanzen-Turnau Airport at Landings.com

Airports in Austria
Styria